Unplugged...and Seated is a live album released by British musician Rod Stewart on 24 May 1993 by Warner Bros. Records. It is Stewart's second live album and his first (and only) appearance on MTV Unplugged. The unplugged versions of "Have I Told You Lately" by Van Morrison, "Reason to Believe", "Having a Party", and "People Get Ready" were released as singles, with "Have I Told You Lately" and "Having a Party" reaching success as singles. A special collector's edition was released in March 2009 on Rhino Records. This two-disc package included the DVD of the MTV performance with 13 songs while the CD contained 17 tracks including two songs ("Gasoline Alley" and "Forever Young") not on the original 1993 release.

Album information
The album was recorded on 5 February 1993 at Universal Studios, Los Angeles as part of MTV's Unplugged series. The event aired on television on 5 May of the same year. Unplugged finds Stewart reunited, for the first time in nearly twenty years, with Ronnie Wood, a fellow Faces band member. Stewart performs some of the classics from his repertoire such as "Tonight's the Night" and "Maggie May", but also adds some new material such as "Having a Party" and "Highgate Shuffle". The album title comes from a joke Stewart made during the taping about "Stay with Me" being difficult to perform while sitting down. Six songs were taped but not included on the subsequent album release, though "It's All Over Now" was included as the B-side to the single for "Reason to Believe".

Track listing

CD release
"Hot Legs" (Rod Stewart, Gary Grainger) – 4:25
(studio version previously released on Foot Loose & Fancy Free)
"Tonight's the Night" (Stewart) – 4:04
(studio version previously released on A Night on the Town)
"Handbags and Gladrags" (Mike d'Abo) – 4:25
(studio version previously released on An Old Raincoat Won't Ever Let You Down)
"Cut Across Shorty" (Wayne Walker, Marijohn Wilkin) – 4:58
(studio version previously released on Gasoline Alley)
"Every Picture Tells A Story" (Stewart, Ron Wood) – 4:45
(studio version previously released on Every Picture Tells a Story)
"Maggie May" (Stewart, Martin Quittenton) – 5:45
(studio version previously released on Every Picture Tells a Story)
"Reason to Believe" (Tim Hardin) – 4:07
(studio version previously released on Every Picture Tells a Story)
"People Get Ready" (Curtis Mayfield) – 4:59
(studio version previously released as a single with Jeff Beck)
"Have I Told You Lately" (Van Morrison) – 4:08
(studio version previously released on Vagabond Heart)
"Tom Traubert's Blues (Waltzing Matilda)" (Tom Waits) – 4:40
(studio version previously released on Lead Vocalist)
"The First Cut Is the Deepest" (Cat Stevens) – 4:12
(studio version previously released on A Night on the Town)
"Mandolin Wind" (Stewart) – 5:23
(studio version previously released on Every Picture Tells a Story)
"Highgate Shuffle" (arrangement by Stewart) – 3:54
(previously unreleased)
"Stay with Me" (Stewart, Wood) – 5:27
(studio version previously released on A Nod Is as Good as a Wink...To a Blind Horse by Faces)
"Having a Party" (Sam Cooke) – 4:44
(previously unreleased)
"Gasoline Alley" (Stewart, Wood)
(bonus track on the "Unplugged…and Seated Collector’s Edition")
(studio version previously released on Gasoline Alley)
"Forever Young" (Stewart, Jim Cregan, Kevin Savigar)
(bonus track on the "Unplugged…and Seated Collector’s Edition")
(studio version previously released on Out of Order)

Live performance
"Hot Legs"
"Tonight's the Night"
"Cut Across Shorty" (feat. Ron Wood)
"Reason to Believe" (feat. Ron Wood)
"It's All Over Now" (Bobby Womack, Shirley Womack) (feat. Ron Wood)
(studio version previously released on Gasoline Alley)
"Every Picture Tells a Story" (feat. Ron Wood)
"Maggie May" (feat. Ron Wood)
"People Get Ready" (feat. Ron Wood)
"Handbags And Gladrags"
"The Killing of Georgie" (Stewart)
(studio version previously released on A Night on the Town)
"Have I Told You Lately" (Van Morrison)
"Tom Traubert's Blues (Waltzing Matilda)"
"Forever Young" (Stewart, Jim Cregan, Kevin Savigar)
"First Cut Is the Deepest"
"I Was Only Joking" (Stewart, Grainger)
(studio version previously released on Foot Loose & Fancy Free)
"Gasoline Alley" (Stewart, Wood) (feat. Ron Wood)
"Highgate Shuffle" (feat. Ron Wood) 
"Sweet Little Rock 'n' Roller" (Chuck Berry) (feat. Ron Wood) 
(studio version previously released on Smiler)
"Mandolin Wind" (feat. Ron Wood)
(studio version previously released on Every Picture Tells a Story)
"Stay with Me" (feat. Ron Wood)
"Having a Party" (feat. Ron Wood)

Personnel
Rod Stewart – lead vocals, banjo
Ronnie Wood – guitar
Jeff Golub – guitar
Jim Cregan – guitar
Don Teschner – guitar, mandolin, violin
Carmine Rojas – bass guitar
Charles Kentiss III – piano, organ
Kevin Savigar – piano, organ, accordion
Phil Parlapiano – accordion, mandolin
Dorian Holley, Darryl Phinnessee, Fred White – backing vocals
Strings arranged and conducted by Jeremy Lubbock
Additional members of the band: Marilyn Baker, Haim Shtrum, Mari Tsumura, Jay Rosen, Kwihee Shamban, Miran Kojian, Brian Leonard, Jean Hugo, Joel Derouin, Bruce Dukov, Joseph Meyer, Ronald Clark, Joan Elardo, David Shostac, Norman Ludwin, Drew Dembowski, David Shamban, Suzie Katayama, James Ross, Larry Corbett.

Production
Michael Ostin – executive production
Joel Stillerman – executive production
Patrick Leonard – production
Alex Coletti – production
Audrey Johns – production
Milt Lage – directing
Jerry Jordan – engineering
Charlie Bouis – assistant engineering
David Gallo – assistant engineering
Marc Moreau – assistant engineering
Doug Sax – mastering
Neal Preston – photography
Greg Ross – design

Charts

Weekly charts

Year-end charts

Certifications

References

MTV Unplugged albums
1993 live albums
Rod Stewart live albums
Warner Records live albums